J.C. Moore was an American football coach.  He was the fourth head football at North Texas Agricultural College—now known as the University of Texas at Arlington—serving for eight seasons, from 1925 to 1932, and compiling a record of 41–29–3.  The school discontinued its football team after completion of the 1985 season.

References

Year of birth missing
Year of death missing
Texas–Arlington Mavericks football coaches